The Furnace Village Historic District is a historic district encompassing a historic colonial industrial area in Easton, Massachusetts.  It is centered on the junction of Foundry Street (Massachusetts Routes 106 and 123) with South Street and Poquanticut Avenue.  The area was settled in 1723, with industrial activity beginning in 1742.  An iron furnace was established here in 1751, and industrial uses continued into the 19th century.   In addition to colonial-era houses, there are also 19th-century worker housing units.

The district was listed on the National Register of Historic Places in 1983.

See also
National Register of Historic Places listings in Bristol County, Massachusetts

References

Historic districts in Bristol County, Massachusetts
Easton, Massachusetts
National Register of Historic Places in Bristol County, Massachusetts
Historic districts on the National Register of Historic Places in Massachusetts